Borisoglebsk is a town in Voronezh Oblast, Russia, located on the left bank of the Vorona River near its confluence with the Khopyor. Population:     65,000 (1969).

History
Borisoglebsk was founded in 1646 and was named for the Russian saints Boris and Gleb, the first saints canonized in Kievan Rus' after the Christianization of the country.

In the late 19th century and the early 20th century Borisoglebsk developed into a busy inland port due to its geographic location within the highly fertile Central Black Earth Region. Barges transported good such as grain, timber, kerosene, fish, eggs, watermelon from the region to large cities in western and central Russia connected to Borisoglebsk by waterways such as St. Petersburg, Moscow, Rostov, Taganrog, and Tsaritsyn. In 1870, a brewer plant opened in the town, producing dark beer and light beer, as well as fruit soda. The brewery has survived and continues to produce beer. According to the 1885 census, the population of Borisoglebsk featured 13,007 inhabitants (6,325 males and 6,682 females), almost exclusively Russian Orthodox. In the early 20th century there was a mixed-sex gymnasium in the town, with 4 female classes and 6 male classes, and a technical railway school.

In January 1906, revolutionary Maria Spiridonova assassinated G. N. Luzhenovsky at the Borisoglebsk railway station. After the Bolsheviks came to power in Borisoglebsk in 1918, one of the first concentration camps in Russia for "alien and petty-bourgeois elements" was organized in the town. In December 1922, Borisoglebsk was created 2nd Military School Red Air Force pilots which became later, the renowned Borisoglebsk Higher Military Order of the Red Banner of Lenin School for Pilots Chkalov.

Administrative and municipal status
Within the framework of administrative divisions, it is, together with twenty-four rural localities, incorporated as Borisoglebsky Urban Okrug—an administrative unit with the status equal to that of the districts. As a municipal division, this administrative unit also has urban okrug status.

Military
The town is host to Borisoglebsk air base.

Notable people
Ivan Fioletov, Bolshevik revolutionary and one of the 26 Baku Commissars.
Mitrofan Nedelin, military commander and Chief Marshal of the Artillery, namesake of the Nedelin catastrophe.

Twin town
 Delmenhorst, Germany
  Blansko , Czech Republic

References

Notes

Sources

External links
Official website of Borisoglebsk 
Borisoglebsk Business Directory 

Cities and towns in Voronezh Oblast
Borisoglebsky Uyezd (Tambov Governorate)